Theseus Killing the Minotaur is an oil-on-panel painting by Cima da Conegliano, created c. 1505, now in the Museo Poldi Pezzoli in Milan. It depicts a scene of Greek mythology, when Theseus killed the Minotaur in Crete's labyrinth.

References

Paintings by Cima da Conegliano
Cultural depictions of Theseus
Paintings depicting Greek myths
1500s paintings
Paintings in the collection of the Museo Poldi Pezzoli